Robert James Parins (August 23, 1918 – May 26, 2017) was an American judge and football executive. Parins was born and raised in Green Bay, Wisconsin; he received a law degree from the University of Wisconsin Law School in 1942. He served as the Brown County, Wisconsin, district attorney from 1949 to 1950 and as a circuit court judge for the county from 1968 to 1982. In the early 1990s, Parins played a notable and controversial role in a case related to Jeffrey Dahmer, an American serial killer. Outside of his legal career, Parins served in various leadership positions for the Green Bay Packers, including serving on the board of directors. In 1982, he was elected president of the Green Bay Packers, serving as the first full-time president in team history. In recognition of his accomplishments, which included the formation of the Green Bay Packers Foundation, financial improvements and facility expansion, Parins was inducted into the Green Bay Packers Hall of Fame in 1998. Parins died in 2017 at the age of 98.

Early life
Robert Parins was born on August 23, 1918, in Green Bay, Wisconsin. He graduated from Green Bay East High School in 1936 and received a law degree from the University of Wisconsin Law School in 1942. Parins was a noted lifelong fan of the Green Bay Packers, which started during his childhood. He attended games in the 1920s and even helped early Packers' players—Parins noted Jug Earp specifically—carry their equipment before games.

Professional career
After his college graduation, Parins took a job as an insurance adjuster with Employer's Mutual of Wausau in Minneapolis, Minnesota. He moved back to Green Bay in 1944 and began practicing law. He served as the Brown County, Wisconsin, district attorney from 1949 to 1950. His law practice ended in 1968 when he was elected a Circuit Court judge for the 14th Judicial Circuit, which covered Brown, Door, and Kewaunee counties. While in this role, he lectured across the state to schools and judicial groups. Parins' served as a Circuit Court judge until 1982, when he retired to serve as president of the Green Bay Packers. After his tenure with the Packers ended in 1989, he returned to serving as a judge in a reserve capacity. He retired from his legal career in 2007.

Jeffrey Dahmer case

In 1993, Parins was selected to hear an appeal regarding the dismissal of police officers Joseph T. Gabrish and John Balcerzak. The officers were originally fired for returning Konerak Sinthasomphone to serial killer Jeffrey Dahmer. Sinthasomphone, a 14-year-old Laotian boy, was abducted by Dahmer and had been reported missing. He escaped Dahmer the next day and was found naked, drugged, and with rectal bleeding by two young black women. The women called police and four officers showed up, two being Gabrish and Balcerzak. The officers threatened to arrest the women if they persisted in trying to help Sinthasomphone or to provide information. The officers escorted Sinthasomphone back inside Dahmer's apartment where he convinced the officers that Sinthasomphone was his romantic partner and was drunk. They subsequently made homophobic remarks regarding the incident. Sinthasomphone became Dahmer's 13th rape and murder victim.

Parins was chosen for his experience with similar cases and due to not living in Milwaukee, where the events took place. In 1994, Parins noted that the officers made mistakes, but felt their dismissals were too harsh. He ordered the officers reinstated and rewarded them around $55,000 as back pay. The ruling was controversial, as the records of conversation between dispatchers, the officers, and witnesses conveyed racism and homophobia by police, which demonstrated bad judgment and contributed to the death of Sinthasomphone. Despite repeated statements to police that Sinthasomphone was underage, police did not bother to investigate any further.

Green Bay Packers
In 1966, Parins was elected to the Board of Directors of Green Bay Packers, Inc., the nonprofit organization that owns the Green Bay Packers. Parins was elected to the Executive Committee as vice president in 1979. In 1981, Parins assumed all of the roles and responsibilities of the presidency, but still retained his vice president title. 

In 1982, after the death of Dominic Olejniczak, Parins was formally elected president of the Packers. Parins became the first full-time president in the Packers' history and took on the additional title of Chief Executive Officer in 1988. He would serve as president for seven years until retiring in 1989. Parins was succeeded in the role of president by Bob Harlan. Parins' retirement marked an end to the tradition of electing local leaders to be president—Harlan was promoted from within and his profession was in footballl. Parins  remained on the Board of Directors until 1994, after which he was named director emeritus. He held the position of honorary chairman from 1991 to 1994.

Although Parins' time as president saw little on-field success, his tenure was notable for the Packers' financial improvements, reorganized management structure and expansion of team facilities. While Parins was president, the Packers' record was 43–61–2 and they only made the playoffs once. However, the team saw profits increase from $2 million in 1986 to $3 million in 1987. Some of this increase can be attributed to the 72 new private box seats added to Lambeau Field, which increased the stadium's capacity to 56,926. The Packers also constructed their first indoor practice facility and expanded its administrative offices. The net worth of the Packers also grew from $14.9 million to $25.9 million during his tenure. Parins' was also credited with separating the head coach and football management duties by hiring a vice president of football operations for the first time. One of Parins' lasting impacts though came from the creation of the Green Bay Packers Foundation—the Packers' charitable organization—in 1986. In recognition of these accomplishments, Parins was inducted into the Green Bay Packers Hall of Fame in 1998.

Personal life
Parins was active in the local community, a noted sports enthusiast, and outdoorsman. He was married in 1941 to Elizabeth and had five children. Parins died on May 26, 2017, in Hobart, Wisconsin, at the age of 98.

References

External links

1918 births
2017 deaths
Green Bay Packers presidents
National Football League team presidents
Wisconsin state court judges
People from Green Bay, Wisconsin
University of Wisconsin Law School alumni
Green Bay East High School alumni
20th-century American judges